The mutiny at Sucro occurred in 206 BCE, during the Second Punic War. A garrison of soldiers established in Iberia by Scipio Africanus grew dissatisfied with their pay, the division of plunder, the long duration of their military service, and shortages of supplies. Receiving word that Scipio was ill, the soldiers mutinied. Scipio recovered from his illness and negotiated with the men via a group of military tribunes, then quelled the uprising by arresting and executing its ringleaders. Afterward, Scipio reestablished and maintained the loyalty of his troops by ensuring they were properly paid and supplied. Ancient writers including the Greek historian Polybius and the Roman historian Livy stressed the significance of the event, portraying Scipio favorably and praising his decisive actions while downplaying the question of whether the mutineers' complaints were justified.

References

External links

 War in Spain (206–205 BC)
 Book XXVIII Chapter 24: Scipio ill; the Romans in Sucro revolt(206 BC)
 Scipio Suppresses A Mutiny in Spain
 Mutiny of Scipio's troops in Spain (206 BC)

Battles of the Second Punic War
Battles in the Valencian Community
206 BC
200s BC conflicts
Mutinies
Roman conquest of the Iberian Peninsula